The Kallakoopah Creek, part of the Lake Eyre basin, is a watercourse located in the southern part of the Simpson Desert in the Australian state of South Australia. It is an anabranch of Warburton Creek.

See also

References

Rivers of South Australia
Lake Eyre basin
Far North (South Australia)